Express Entertainment is a Pakistani entertainment television channel that airs dramas, soaps and lifestyle programs.

History 
Express Entertainment and sister station Express News are part of Express Media Group.

Express Entertainment airs through Prime TV in the United Kingdom and Europe. The channel launched on 1 January 2012.

Current programming

Drama
 Aik Thi Laila
Hoor Pari Noor
Noor (2022 TV series)
 Oye Motti (season 2)
Ghamandi

Reality
Khel Ke Jeet
The Talk Talk Show
The Mirza Malik Show
Time Out with Ahsan Khan

Upcoming programs
Gunnah

Former programming

Anthologies
Drama Nama
 Aik Aur Kahani
 Kabhi Band Kabhi Baja
 Kya Yehi Pyaar Hai
 Naiki Ka Sikka
Oye Motti
 Shadi ka Laddoo
Yeh Betiyaan

Drama

Ab Kay Sawan Barsay
 Apni Kahani Kaise Kahein
Baat Hai Ruswai Ki
 Bahu Raniyan
 Baji Irshad 
 Behkay Kadam
Beparawa
Bin Badal Barsat
 Chaand Kay Pass
Chingari
Chor Darwazay
Dard Rukta Nahin
 Dil Hi To Hai 
Dil Majboor Sa Lage
Dil Nawab Ki Sultana
Do Naina
 Ek Jhoota Lafz Mohabbat
 Ek Sitam Aur Sahi
 Emaan
 Gar Maan Reh Jaye
Ghamandi
 Gila Kis Se Karein
Gumaan
 Gustakh
Gustakh Dil
Hamare Dada Ki Waisyat
 Hum Pe Jo Guzarti Hai
Inteha
Ishq Bepanah
 Ishq Nachaya
 Ishq Na Kariyo Koi
Janbaaz
 Jab Tak Ishq Nahi Hota
 Jhooti
 Jugnu
 Khirchiyan
 Koi Deepak Ho
Kokh
Maghrib Ki Esha
 Mahe Tamam
 Main Baba Ki Ladli
Masoom
Mein Jeena Chahti Hoon
 Meray Chotay Mian 
 Mere Huzoor
Meri Anaya
 Muthi Bhar Chahat
Nighebaan
Pal Main Ishq Pal Main Nahi
 Pashemaan
 Pari Houn Main
 Parwaaz
 Piyari Bittu
 Qismat Ka Likha
 Rab Raazi
 Rang Baaz
Rani Nokrani
 Rashk
 Rok Lo Aaj Ki Raat Ko
 Roothi Roothi Zindagi
 Saanp Seerhi
Saza e Ishq
Shehr-e-Malal
Shikwa Na Shikayat
 Shukrana
 Sirat-e-Mustaqim
 Sodai 
Suno Na
 Talkhiyaan
Terha Aangan
Tere Pyaar Ke Bharose
 Thori Si Bewafai
 Tum Kahan Jao Ge?
 Tishnagi
 Tum Woh Nahi
 Yehi Hai Zindgai
 Teri Meri Dosti
Zid

Miniseries
Aik Thi Laila
Baarwan Khiladi
Main Aisi Kyun Houn

Sitcom
 Aakhri Joint Family
Bhai Bhai
Haseena Chaalbaaz
Honey Moon
Jakaria Kalsoom Ki Love Story
 Jeem Chay
Khatti Meethi Love Story
Larka Karachi Ka Kuri Lahore Ki
Mohabbat Zindabad
Mr Mom
Teen Talwar

Soap opera
Agar Tum Saath Ho
Amrit Aur Maya
 Apne Paraye
 Aslam Bhai & Company
 Baby
Bhanwar
Chandni
Daman
 Dil Ek Khilona Tha
Dil-e-Nadaan
 Drama Na Mar Jaye
 Ishq Mai Aesa Haal Bhi Hona Hai
Jaltay Khawab
Jhoomer
 Kalank
 Kaliyan Mere Angan Ki
 Masters
Mein Rani
Mera Wajood
Middle Class
Mohabbat Zindagi Hai
Naseebon Jali Nargis
Nawabzadiyaan
 Noor
Paposh Nagar Ki Neelam
Qismat Ka Likha
Sitam
 We Are Family

Reality shows

 Satrangi
Aamir Online
 Pakistan Ramazan
  Piyara Ramazan
Jeeway Pakistan
Time Out With Ahsan Khan
Subhan Ramazan
Kasoti Online
Shab e Meraj
Rabi Ul Awal
 Bus Kardo Bus

Acquired
20 Minutes
 Anamika
 Asi
 Fareb-Ek Haseen Dhoka
 Fear Files: Darr Ki Sacchi Tasvirein
 Hitler Didi
 Marium (Turkish Drama)
Kaun Banega Crorepati
 Love Idhar Udhar
 Manahil Aur Khalil
 Meenay Mera Pyar
 Meher
 Mere Baba Jaan
Mirza Ghalib
 Mrs. Pammi Pyarelal
 Na Bole Tum Na Maine Kuch Kaha
Yeh Hai Meri Kahani

Films 
Ooper Gori Ka Makaan
 No More Nadaniya
 Dusri Dulhan
 Meri Gurya
 Pyari Bhangan 
 Achi Phuppo 
 No More Nadaniyaan
 Jakariya Kulsoom Ki Bari Eid
 Tum Hi Hoo
 Ankh Macholi Today
 Mujse Shadi Karogi

See also
 List of Pakistani television serials

References

External links
 

 

Television stations in Pakistan
Television channels and stations established in 2012
Lakson Group
2012 establishments in Pakistan
Television stations in Karachi